Donaghmore, Donoughmore or Domhnach Mór (Irish "large church") may refer to:

Northern Ireland, UK
Donaghmore, County Down, a parish and hamlet
Donaghmore, County Tyrone, a village
 Dunnamore, County Tyrone, a village and townland (also spelt Donamore/Dunamore)

Republic of Ireland
Donaghmore, County Cork, a parish, see Barretts (barony)
Donaghmore, County Donegal, a parish
Donaghmore, County Kildare, a civil parish

 including Grangewilliam a monastic settlement also known as Donaghmore or Domhnach Mór

Donaghmore, County Laois
Donaghmore, County Louth
Donaghmore Souterrain
Donaghmore, County Meath
Donaghmore, County Tipperary
Donaghmore, County Wicklow
 Ballyragget, County Kilkenny, also known as Donaghmore/Donoughmore